List of presidents of the Chamber of Representatives of Uruguay.

Below is a list of office-holders from 1830.

References

External links

Politics of Uruguay
Uruguay, Chamber of Deputies